The Royal Regina Rifles is a Primary Reserve infantry regiment of the Canadian Army. Prior to 1982 the regiment was known as The Regina Rifle Regiment.  The Royal Regina Rifles are part of 3rd Canadian Division's 38 Canadian Brigade Group.

The regiment was nicknamed "The Johns" during World War II because of the high proportion of "Farmer Johns" in its ranks.

Lineage

The Royal Regina Rifles
Originated 3 July 1905 in Regina, Saskatchewan when a "regiment of infantry in the districts of Assiniboia and Saskatchewan" was authorized
Redesignated 2 April 1907 as the 95th Regiment
Redesignated 1 May 1908 as a rifle regiment
Redesignated 1 June 1909 as two separate regiments, designated the 105th Regiment (now The North Saskatchewan Regiment) and the 95th Regiment
Redesignated 16 September 1913 as the 95th "Saskatchewan Rifles"
Amalgamated 15 March 1920 with the 60th Rifles of Canada and redesignated as The South Saskatchewan Regiment
Reorganized 15 May 1924 into five separate regiments: The Weyburn Regiment (now The South Saskatchewan Regiment); The Saskatchewan Border Regiment (now The South Saskatchewan Regiment); The South Saskatchewan Regiment (now The Saskatchewan Dragoons); The Assiniboia Regiment (now the 10th Field Artillery Regiment, RCA); and The Regina Rifle Regiment
Amalgamated 15 December 1936 with the 'Headquarters' and 'A Company' of the 12th Machine Gun Battalion, CMGC and retaining the designation as The Regina Rifle Regiment
Redesignated 7 November 1940 as the 2nd Battalion, The Regina Rifle Regiment
Redesignated 4 April 1946 as The Regina Rifle Regiment
Redesignated 5 July 1982 as The Royal Regina Rifle Regiment
Redesignated 24 October 1984 as The Royal Regina Rifles

The 60th Rifles of Canada
Originated 2 January 1913 in Moose Jaw, Saskatchewan as the 60th Rifles of Canada
Amalgamated 15 March 1920 with the 95th Saskatchewan Rifles

The 12th Machine Gun Battalion, CMGC
Originated 1 June 1919 in Saskatoon, Saskatchewan as the 12th Machine Gun Brigade, CMGC
Redesignated 15 September 1924 as the 12th Machine Gun Battalion, CMGC
Amalgamated 15 December 1936 with The Regina Rifle Regiment

Lineage chart
Lineage of the Royal Regina Rifles:

Operational history

The Great War

Details of the 95th Saskatchewan Rifles were placed on active service on 6 August 1914 for local protective duty.

The 28th Battalion (Northwest), CEF, was authorized on 7 November 1914 and embarked for Britain on 29 May 1915 and arrived in France on 18 September 1915. The 28th Battalion fought as part of the 6th Infantry Brigade, 2nd Canadian Division in France and Flanders until the end of the war. The 28th Battalion disbanded on 30 August 1920.

The 68th Battalion (Regina), CEF, was authorized on 20 April 1915  and embarked for Britain on 28 April 1916, where it provided reinforcements for units in the field until 6 July 1916, when its personnel were absorbed by the 32nd Reserve Battalion, CEF.

The 195th Battalion (City of Regina), CEF, was authorized on 15 July 1916. Based in Regina, Saskatchewan, the unit began recruiting during the winter of 1915/16 in that city. It embarked for Britain on 31 October 1916, where its personnel were absorbed by the 32nd Reserve Battalion, on 11 or 12 November 1916, to provide reinforcements for units the field. Lieutenant-Colonel A. C. Garner commanded the battalion throughout its existence.

Between the Wars
On 15 May 1924,  following extensive reorganizations of the Canadian Militia, each of the South Saskatchewan Regiment's battalions became a distinct regiment, and the Regina Rifle Regiment was created from the 1st Battalion. In the 1936 reorganization of the Militia, the Headquarters and A Company of the 12th Machine Gun Battalion, CMGC, merged into the Regina Rifles, which existed as a single battalion militia regiment until 1939.

The Second World War

Details from the regiment were called out on service on 26 August 1939 and then placed on active service on 1 September 1939 as The Regina Rifle Regiment, CASF (Canadian Active Service Force), for local protection duties. The details called out on active service were disbanded on 31 December 1940. The regiment subsequently mobilized The Regina Rifle Regiment, CASF, for active service on 24 May 1940. It was redesignated the 1st Battalion, The Regina Rifle Regiment, CASF, on 7 November 1940 and embarked for Britain on 24 August 1941. On D-Day, 6 June 1944, it landed in Normandy, France as part of the 7th Infantry Brigade, 3rd Canadian Infantry Division, and it continued to fight in North-West Europe until the end of the war. The 1st Battalion was disbanded on 15 January 1946.

Farmer Johns was their nickname and the name's origin came from other Canadian soldiers dismissing them as "just a bunch of Farmer Johns". They were farmers, students, and fur trappers who served as soldiers of Regina Rifles Regiment of the Canadian military.

The regiment mobilized the 3rd Battalion, The Regina Rifle Regiment, CASF, for active service on 12 May 1942. It was subsequently redesignated the 2nd Airfield Defence Battalion (The Regina Rifle Regiment), CASF, on 19 July 1943 and served in Canada in a home defence role as part of Pacific Command. It was disbanded on 15 November 1943.

On 1 June 1945, a third Active Force component of the regiment, the 4th Battalion, The Regina Rifle Regiment, CIC, CAOF, was mobilized for service with the Canadian Army Occupation Force in Germany. The 4th Battalion was disbanded on 4 April 1946. The 2nd (Reserve) Battalion did not mobilize.

During the Second World War members of the regiment received 14 Military Medals with one bar to that award, seven Distinguished Service Orders, seven Military Cross awards, a British Empire Medal, an Africa Star, three French Croix de Guerre, and a Netherlands Bronze Lion.  Many more were Mentioned in Dispatches.

The regiment suffered 458 fatal casualties by 7 May 1945.

Its first taste of combat came in Normandy, landing on Juno Beach on D-Day, during which it was the first Canadian regiment to successfully secure a beachhead. It later faced the 12th SS Panzer Division Hitlerjugend, which was almost completely annihilated by the British and Canadian forces. The regiment later entered Caen.

Korea and NATO
In 1946, the regiment reverted to a single-battalion militia regiment.

On 4 May 1951, the regiment mobilized two temporary Active Force companies designated "E" and "F" Company. "E" Company was reduced to nil strength upon its personnel being incorporated into the 1st Canadian Rifle Battalion for service in Germany as part of the 27th Canadian Infantry Brigade on North Atlantic Treaty Organization duty in Germany. "F" Company was initially used as a reinforcement pool for "E" Company. On 15 May 1952, it was reduced to nil strength, upon its personnel being absorbed by the newly formed 2nd Canadian Rifle Battalion for service in Korea with the United Nations. "F" Company was disbanded on 29 July 1953. The 1st and 2nd Canadian Rifle Battalions which became the Regular Force 1st and 2nd Battalions of the Queen's Own Rifles of Canada.

Royal was added to the regimental title on 5 July 1982, and the name was shortened to the Royal Regina Rifles on 24 October 1984.

United Nations missions (1980–2000) 
Since the reductions of the Regular Force battalions, the Primary Reserve members of the regiment have augmented the Regular Force units  and deployed operationally in support of operations in Cyprus, Former Yugoslavia, and Bosnia.

Afghanistan
The regiment contributed an aggregate of more than 20% of its authorized strength to the various Task Forces which served in Afghanistan between 2002 and 2014.

2015 onwards 
Soldiers of the Royal Regina Rifles contribute to domestic and expeditionary operations on a regular basis.

 Operation Lentus  Wildfires in Saskatchewan's north threatening life and property of Canadians.
 Operation Reassurance  NATO's commitment to stability in Eastern Europe.

Freedom of the city 
On 5 September 2015, the largest freedom of the city parade in Regina since the end of the Second World War was exercised by the Royal Regina Rifles.  Collaborating with all local military units (10th Field Artillery Regiment, RCA; 38 Signal Regiment; 38 Service Battalion; 16 Field Ambulance; and 15 Wing Moose Jaw) a Canadian Armed Forces Open House was held at the Regina Armoury throughout the day.  The culmination of the day was a charity gala dinner entertaining over 315 guests. The patron for the evening was the Lieutenant Governor of Saskatchewan.  The charity raised seed money for a rewrite of the regimental history.

Previous to that a freedom of the city was exercised by the Royal Regina Rifles in Regina on June 4, 2007.

Perpetuations

The Great War
28th Battalion (Northwest), CEF
68th Battalion (Regina), CEF
195th (City of Regina) Battalion, CEF.

Battle honours
In the list below, battle honours in capitals were awarded for participation in large operations and campaigns, while those in lowercase indicate honours granted for more specific battles. Rifle regiments do not carry colours. They may
emblazon their battle honours on regimental appointments such as cap badges. Those battle honours in bold type are authorized to be emblazoned on regimental appointments.

Great War

Second World War

Afghanistan

Alliances
 - The Rifles

Media 
 Up the Johns! The Story of the Royal Regina Rifles by Stewart A.G Mein (1992)
 In the flashback scenes in the film I Confess, where Montgomery Clift is a soldier in World War II, he is wearing a uniform with a "Regina Rifle Regiment Canada" shoulder patch.

Regimental Museum of The Royal Regina Rifles

The Regimental Museum of The Royal Regina Rifles is located in the Regina Armoury in the Saskatchewan Military Museum.

The Regimental Church

The Regimental Church of The Royal Regina Rifles is Saint Paul's (Anglican) Cathedral in Regina, Saskatchewan.  The Colours of units that The Royal Regina Rifles perpetuate hang in perpetuity in the cathedral.

See also
 List of Canadian organizations with royal patronage
 The Canadian Crown and the Canadian Forces

References
 www.regiments.org - The Royal Regina Rifles
 www.reginarifles.ca - The Regina Rifles in WW II
 Juno Beach - The Regina Rifles on D-Day
  Mein, Stewart A.G. Up The Johns! : The story of the Royal Regina Rifles. [Regina] : Senate of The Royal Regina Rifles, 1992.
 regimentalrogue.com
 Regina Amoury

Order of precedence

External links
 

Royal Regina Rifles
Rifle regiments of Canada
Military units and formations established in 1924
1924 establishments in Saskatchewan
Military units and formations of Saskatchewan
Organizations based in Regina, Saskatchewan
Infantry regiments of Canada in World War II